Robert L. Brock (December 27, 1924June 7, 1998) was an American businessman. He was born in Pawnee Rock, Kansas, and graduated from Sterling High School and Kansas University.

He started "Inn Operations" with a friend and sold it to Holiday Inns, Inc., to manage "Topeka Inn Management". As chairman of TIM (later renamed Brock Hotel Corporation), the first and at the time largest franchisee of Holiday Inns, he founded ShowBiz Pizza Place in 1980 in Topeka, Kansas after becoming a Pizza Time Theatre franchisee. He also started The Residence Inn line of hotels with Jack DeBoer. Marriott later bought the brand and renamed all locations "Residence Inn by Marriott".

ShowBiz Pizza Place Inc. later superseded Pizza Time Theatre Inc. after SPP bought the PTT assets and intellectual property in 1984. All SPP stores were renamed Chuck E. Cheese's in 1992. In 1998 ShowBiz Pizza Place Inc. was renamed CEC Entertainment Inc., and continues to do business under this name.

He died on June 7, 1998, in Dallas, Texas.

See also
 Chuck E. Cheese
 Aaron Fechter
 ShowBiz Pizza Place
 Nolan Bushnell

References

External links
 CJ Online's T-Town News (Dead)

1998 deaths
1924 births
People from Barton County, Kansas
University of Kansas alumni
American hoteliers
Deaths from cancer in Kansas